Yi Siling (born May 6, 1989 in Guiyang, Hunan) is a Chinese female sport shooter specializing in 10 meter air rifle events, she is the gold medalists for 2012 Olympics, 2010 World Championships and 2010 Asian Games.  Yi started shooting in 2007 and made her international debut in 2009. In 2010, she won the World Championships at the 10m air rifle and became the first person to qualify for the 2012 Summer Olympics. At the Olympics, she captured the first gold medal of the games by winning the 10 m air rifle event.

Athletic career
Yi Siling was born in Guiyang County, Chenzhou, Hunan, China. She joined Guangdong Province Shooting Team in 2007 after graduation from Zhuhai Sports School and made her international debut in 2009.

In 2009, Yi won silver at the Asian Championships in the 10m air rifle with a score of 502.9.  The next year, she won the event at the 2010 Asian Games with a score of 504.9.  Before the World Championships, she was diagnosed with kidney stones and had to undergo surgery.  She made a full recovery and finished first at the World Championships with a score of 505.6.  In the process, she set a new world record and became the first person to qualify for the 2012 Summer Olympics.

In 2011, Yi placed second at the Asian Championships in the 10 m air rifle with a score of 501.1.  In 2012, she won the event with a score of 502.2.

Yi entered the 2012 Olympics ranked number one in the world at the 10 m air rifle.  In Olympic competition she scored 399 out of a possible 400 in the preliminary round, tying for first place with Sylwia Bogacka.  In the finals at the Royal Artillery Barracks, she turned in a score of 10+ on every shot, while Bogacka had a costly 9.7 on shot eight of ten.  Thus, Yi out shot Sylwia Bogacka 103.9 to 103.2 in the finals to win the first gold medal of the 2012 Summer Olympics with a total score of 502.9.  Of her victory, Yi commented "My stability help me a lot today and at the same time I think I'm quite lucky".

Including her Olympic win, Yi has won ten medals and made the finals 13 times in 16 career events.  She planned to try to defend her gold at the next Olympics, but at the 2016 Olympics, she was only able to take home the bronze, with a score of 185.4 in the final.

Personal life
Yi attended Zhuhai Sports School in Zhuhai, China for her education in 2004 after her dropped out school because of financial problem. In Zhuhai Sports School, everything for students were almost free. Before taking up shooting, she tried track and field and dancing.  She is nicknamed "Shooting Beauty" due to her good looks.

After the 2012 Olympics, Yi said she planned to take a vacation and spend time with her family. "I have been away from home for more than a year and now I miss my family a lot," she said.

Records
These records were made under the ISSR rules before its modification in 2013.

See also
 China at the 2012 Summer Olympics

References

External links
 
 
 

1989 births
Living people
People from Chenzhou
Sport shooters from Hunan
Chinese female sport shooters
ISSF rifle shooters
Olympic shooters of China
Olympic medalists in shooting
Olympic gold medalists for China
Shooters at the 2012 Summer Olympics
Shooters at the 2016 Summer Olympics
Medalists at the 2012 Summer Olympics
2016 Olympic bronze medalists for China
Asian Games medalists in shooting
Shooters at the 2010 Asian Games
Shooters at the 2014 Asian Games
Asian Games gold medalists for China
Asian Games silver medalists for China
Medalists at the 2010 Asian Games
Medalists at the 2014 Asian Games
Universiade medalists in shooting
Universiade gold medalists for China
Medalists at the 2015 Summer Universiade